The Serbia national rugby sevens team is controlled by Serbian rugby federation. In 2015 Serbia won second place in the European Championship B division and is qualified to compete in 2016 in A division of European Series. For the 2022 season, the team played in the Rugby Europe Sevens Conference 1.

Current squad
Serbian current squad for the 2015 European Championship - B division:
Igor Dejanović
Andrija Janković
Andrej Banduka
Danijel Kajan
Vitor Ljubičić
Aleksandar Nedeljković
Istok Totić
Marko Knežević
Marko Isailović
Uroš Babić
Miladin Živanov
Milan Marinković

References

External links
Serbian rugby federation

Rugby union in Serbia
r
National rugby sevens teams